My Gentleman Friend is a 1961 album by Blossom Dearie.

Track listing
"Little Jazz Bird" (George Gershwin, Ira Gershwin) – 3:43
"Gentleman Friend" (Arnold B. Horwitt, Richard Lewine) – 3:49
"It's Too Good to Talk About Now" (Cy Coleman, Carolyn Leigh) – 3:09
"Chez moi" (Jean Féline, Paul Misraki, Bruce Sievier) – 3:09
"You Fascinate Me So" (Coleman, Leigh) – 3:33
"You've Got Something I Want" (Bob Haymes) – 2:37
"Boum" (E. Ray Goetz, Charles Trenet) – 2:10
"L'étang" (Paul Misraki) – 2:27
"Hello Love" (Michael Preston Barr, Dion McGregor) – 2:51
"Someone to Watch Over Me" (George Gershwin, Ira Gershwin) – 5:57

Personnel
Blossom Dearie – vocals (all tracks), piano (all tracks except "You've Got Something I Want")
Kenny Burrell – guitar (all tracks)
Ray Brown – double bass (all tracks)
Ed Thigpen – drums (all tracks)
Bobby Jaspar – flute (on "Chez Moi", "Boum", "L'etang")

References

1961 albums
Blossom Dearie albums
Verve Records albums
Albums produced by Norman Granz